Arthur Hopton may refer to:
 Sir Arthur Hopton (1488–1555), English politician
 Arthur Hopton (died 1607), English politician
 Sir Arthur Hopton (diplomat) (1588?–1650), English diplomat who served as ambassador to Spain